The Dutch angle, also known as Dutch tilt, canted angle, vortex angle, or oblique angle, is a type of camera shot which involves setting the camera at an angle on its roll axis so that the shot is composed with vertical lines at an angle to the side of the frame, or so that the horizon line of the shot is not parallel with the bottom of the camera frame. This produces a viewpoint akin to tilting one's head to the side. In cinematography, the Dutch angle is one of many cinematic techniques often used to portray psychological uneasiness or tension in the subject being filmed. The Dutch tilt is strongly associated with the German movie scene during the expressionist movement, which used the Dutch angle extensively.

Etymology 

The word "Dutch" in this context is a bastardisation of the word Deutsch, the German word for "German"; it is not related to the Dutch people or language. It originated in the First World War, as Navy blockades made the import (and export) of movies impossible.

The "Dutch angle" is also known as a "German angle" due to its popularity in silent-era German films that popularized the shots, although one of the earliest recorded occurrences of the camera technique is to be found in the Edwin S. Porter American film Dream of a Rarebit Fiend (1906), itself based on the 1904 cartoon of the same name, already known for the use of surrealist and oblique angles in its drawings.

Method 

The Dutch angle is a shot in which the camera has been rotated around the axis of the lens and relative to the horizon or vertical lines in the shot.

The primary use of a Dutch angle is to cause a sense of unease or disorientation for the viewer. Dutch angles are often static shots, but in a dynamic (moving) Dutch angle shot, the camera can pivot, pan, or track along the established diagonal axis for the shot.

History 

Dziga Vertov's 1929 experimental documentary Man with a Movie Camera contains uses of the Dutch angle, among other innovative techniques pioneered by Vertov himself.

The angle was widely used to depict madness, unrest, exoticism, and disorientation in German Expressionism. Montages of Dutch angles are often structured such that the tilts are horizontally opposed in each shot – for example, a right-tilted shot will be followed with a left-tilted shot, and so on.

In Hollywood's classic age, one filmmaker who used Dutch angles often was Alfred Hitchcock, whose early career included time at UFA studios in Germany; examples include Suspicion (1941), Strangers on a Train (1951), and The Man Who Knew Too Much (1956).

The 1949 film The Third Man makes extensive use of Dutch angle shots, to emphasize the main character's alienation in a foreign environment. Director Carol Reed has said that William Wyler gave him a spirit level after seeing the film, to sardonically encourage him to use more traditional shooting angles.

Dutch angles were used extensively in the satirical 1960s Batman TV series (and its 1966 film spin-off) in which each villain had his or her own angle, as they were "crooked".

Dutch angles are frequently used by film directors who have a background in the visual arts, such as Tim Burton (in Edward Scissorhands and Ed Wood), and Terry Gilliam (in Brazil, The Fisher King, 12 Monkeys, Fear and Loathing in Las Vegas and Tideland) to represent madness, disorientation, or drug psychosis. In his Evil Dead trilogy, Sam Raimi used Dutch angles to show that a character had become possessed by evil. In Rainer Werner Fassbinder’s Die Sehnsucht der Veronika Voss (1982), a Dutch angle is used (twice) to convey an odd tension that strangers are exerting on the main character.

Power Rangers used Dutch angles frequently under former stunt coordinator and executive producer Koichi Sakamoto.

The Dutch angle is an overt cinematographical technique that can be overused. The science-fiction film Battlefield Earth (2000), in particular, drew sharp criticism for its pervasive use of the Dutch angle. In the words of film critic Roger Ebert, "the director, Roger Christian, has learned from better films that directors sometimes tilt their cameras, but he has not learned why".

Dutch angles are often used in horror video games, particularly those with static camera angles such as early entries in the Resident Evil and Silent Hill franchises. Similar to their use in movies, these angles are used to bring about a feeling of unease in the player.

Examples

See also 

 Dolly zoom

References

External links 

 

Cinematography
Cinematic techniques
Photographic techniques
Television terminology